Robert Howell Hall (November 28, 1921 – October 14, 1995) was a United States district judge of the United States District Court for the Northern District of Georgia.

Education and career

Born in Soperton, Georgia, Hall received a Bachelor of Science degree from the University of Georgia in 1941 and was in the United States Army Reserve JAG Corps during World War II, from 1942 to 1946. He received a Bachelor of Laws from the University of Virginia School of Law in 1948. He was a Professor of law at Emory University School of Law from 1948 to 1961, and was also a lawyer for the State Attorney General's Office of Georgia from 1953 to 1961, serving therein as a deputy assistant state attorney general from 1953 to 1959 and then Chief of the Criminal Division until 1961. He was a judge of the Georgia Court of Appeals from 1961 to 1969, presiding judge of that court from 1969 to 1974, and a justice of the Supreme Court of Georgia from 1974 to 1979.

Federal judicial service

On September 28, 1979, Hall was nominated by President Jimmy Carter to a new seat on the United States District Court for the Northern District of Georgia created by 92 Stat. 1629. He was confirmed by the United States Senate on October 31, 1979, and received his commission on November 2, 1979. He assumed senior status on December 31, 1990, serving in that capacity until his death on October 14, 1995, in Atlanta, Georgia.

References

Sources
 

1921 births
1995 deaths
People from Soperton, Georgia
Judges of the United States District Court for the Northern District of Georgia
United States district court judges appointed by Jimmy Carter
20th-century American judges
Justices of the Supreme Court of Georgia (U.S. state)
Georgia Court of Appeals judges
University of Georgia alumni
University of Virginia School of Law alumni
United States Army officers
United States Army personnel of World War II